Uven Spur is a small rock spur just southwest of Tunga Spur, extending from the Kirwan Escarpment in Queen Maud Land, Antarctica. It was mapped by Norwegian cartographers from surveys and air photos by Norwegian-British-Swedish Antarctic Expedition (NBSAE) (1949–52) and additional air photos (1958–59), and named Uven.

Ridges of Queen Maud Land
Princess Astrid Coast